The following outline is provided as an overview of and guide to category theory, the area of study in mathematics that examines in an abstract way the properties of particular mathematical concepts, by formalising them as collections of objects and arrows (also called morphisms, although this term also has a specific, non category-theoretical sense), where these collections satisfy certain basic conditions.  Many significant areas of mathematics can be formalised as categories, and the use of category theory allows many intricate and subtle mathematical results in these fields to be stated, and proved, in a much simpler way than without the use of categories.

Essence of category theory 

 Category –
 Functor –
 Natural transformation –

Branches of category theory 
 Homological algebra –
 Diagram chasing –
 Topos theory –
 Enriched category theory –
 Higher category theory –
 Categorical logic –

Specific categories 
Category of sets –
Concrete category –
Category of vector spaces –
Category of graded vector spaces –
Category of chain complexes –
Category of finite dimensional Hilbert spaces –
Category of sets and relations –
Category of topological spaces –
Category of metric spaces –
Category of preordered sets –
Category of groups –
Category of abelian groups –
Category of rings –
Category of magmas –
Category of medial magmas –

Objects
Initial object –
Terminal object –
Zero object –
Subobject –
Group object –
Magma object –
Natural number object –
Exponential object –

Morphisms

 
Epimorphism –
Monomorphism –
Zero morphism –
Normal morphism –
Dual (category theory) –
Groupoid –
Image (category theory) –
Coimage –
Commutative diagram –
Cartesian morphism –
Slice category –

Functors

Isomorphism of categories –
Natural transformation –
Equivalence of categories –
Subcategory –
Faithful functor –
Full functor –
Forgetful functor –
Yoneda lemma –
Representable functor –
Functor category –
Adjoint functors –
Galois connection –
Pontryagin duality –
Affine scheme –
Monad (category theory) –
Comonad –
Combinatorial species –
Exact functor –
Derived functor –
Dominant functor –
Enriched functor –
Kan extension of a functor –
Hom functor –

Limits

Product (category theory) –
Equaliser (mathematics) –
Kernel (category theory) –
Pullback (category theory)/fiber product –
Inverse limit –
Pro-finite group –
Colimit –
Coproduct –
Coequalizer –
Cokernel –
Pushout (category theory) –
Direct limit –
Biproduct –
Direct sum –

Additive structure

Preadditive category –
Additive category –
Pre-Abelian category –
Abelian category –
Exact sequence –
Exact functor –
Snake lemma –
Nine lemma –
Five lemma –
Short five lemma –
Mitchell's embedding theorem –
Injective cogenerator –
Derived category –
Triangulated category –
Model category –
2-category –

Dagger categories

Dagger symmetric monoidal category –
Dagger compact category –
Strongly ribbon category –

Monoidal categories

Closed monoidal category –
Braided monoidal category –

Cartesian closed category
Topos
Category of small categories

Structure

Semigroupoid –
Comma category –
Localization of a category –
Enriched category –
Bicategory –

Topoi, toposes

 Sheaf –
 Gluing axiom  –
 Descent (category theory) –
 Grothendieck topology –
 Introduction to topos theory –
 Subobject classifier –
 Pointless topology –
 Heyting algebra –

History of category theory 

History of category theory

Persons influential in the field of category theory

Category theory scholars 

Saunders Mac Lane
Samuel Eilenberg
Max Kelly
William Lawvere
André Joyal

See also 

Abstract nonsense –
Glossary of category theory –

References 

Category theory
Category theory
Category theory